Guama can refer to:

People
Guamá, a Taíno cacique who led a rebellion against the Spanish rule in Cuba in the 1530s

Places
Guama, Brazil, a small town in the state of Pará in Brazil,
Guamá, Cuba, a municipality in Santiago de Cuba Province, Cuba
Guama, Venezuela, a town in Yaracuy state, Venezuela
Guamá, San Germán, Puerto Rico, a barrio in the San Germán municipality of Puerto Rico (U.S.)

Plants
Guama, Spanish name of Inga edulis (Ice-cream-bean) in South America.